Nanna Christiansen (born 17 June 1989) is a Danish football midfielder currently playing in the Elitedivisionen for Brøndby, with whom she has also played the Champions League. She was named Danish Young Footballer of the Year in 2006.

Christiansen has been a member of the senior Danish national team since 2009; making her debut in a 2–0 defeat to the United States at the Algarve Cup and being named in the squad for UEFA Women's Euro 2009. As a junior international she had played at the 2006 and 2007 U-19 European Championships.

Christiansen made her international debut for Denmark in the 2009 Algarve Cup against United States on 4 March 2009. Later on, she was named in national coach Kenneth Heiner-Møller's Denmark squad for UEFA Women's Euro 2013. On 8 October 2019, she made her 100th international appearance against Georgia.

Personal life
Christiansen has been diagnosed with diabetes but states it has not affected her football. In 2013, she was working as an assistant in a nursery school.

References

External links 
 

1989 births
Living people
Danish women's footballers
Denmark women's international footballers
Brøndby IF (women) players
Women's association football midfielders
FIFA Century Club
UEFA Women's Euro 2017 players